The second edition of the Hip Hop World Awards was hosted by D'banj and Tana. It was held on 17 March 2007 at the Muson Center for the second consecutive year. Paul Play was nominated for six awards and ended up going home with four.

Winners and nominees
Winners are emboldened.

References

2007 music awards
2007 in Nigerian music
The Headies
March 2007 events in Africa